Sun Yifan (born 1 May 1989) is Chinese footballer who currently plays for Heilongjiang Lava Spring in the China League One.

Club career
Sun Yifan started his professional football career in 2008 when he joined Shaanxi Chanba for the 2008 Chinese Super League campaign.  In February 2009, Sun transferred to China League One club Nanchang Hengyuan. On 24 July 2010, he made his debut for Nanchang in the 2010 Chinese Super League against Jiangsu Sainty, coming on as a substitute for Zhao Zuojun in the 38th minute. He would be part of the squad that moved cities as the club renamed themselves Shanghai Shenxin.

In March 2014, he transferred to China League Two side Meizhou Kejia. After two seasons he would rejoin his previous club Shanghai Shenxin. After four seasons the club disbanded on 3 February 2020 due to unpaid wages throughout the 2019 league season.

Career statistics 
Statistics accurate as of match played 31 December 2020.

References

External links
 

1989 births
Living people
Chinese footballers
Footballers from Heilongjiang
Beijing Renhe F.C. players
Shanghai Shenxin F.C. players
Meizhou Hakka F.C. players
Heilongjiang Ice City F.C. players
Chinese Super League players
China League One players
China League Two players
Association football defenders